Khon Kaen is one of Thailand's seventy-six provinces (changwat) which lies in central northeastern Thailand. Neighboring provinces are (from north, clockwise) Nong Bua Lamphu, Udon Thani, Kalasin, Maha Sarakham, Buriram, Nakhon Ratchasima, Chaiyaphum, Phetchabun, and Loei.

History

The first city of the area was established in 1783 when Rajakruluang settled there with 330 people. King Rama I made Rajakruluang the first governor of the area when establishing tighter connections with the Isan area. The main city was moved six times until in 1879 it reached its present-day location at Nuang Kaw. Khon Kaen was under the governance of Udon in the early period of Rattanakosin, c. 2450 BCE. The Integrated Opisthorchiasis Control Program, also known as the Lawa Project, an internationally recognized liver fluke control program, has its offices in the Ban Phai and Ban Haet Districts south of Khon Kaen city.

Other satellite cities that has to do with the separation from the city of Suwannabhumi and later separated into a city in the province of Khon Kaen after 1797 that includes the city of Mancha Khiri district.

Khon Kaen was incorporated as a city in 1797.

Geography
Khon Kaen occupies part of the Khorat Plateau. The Chi and Phong Rivers flow through the province.

National parks
There are a total of four national parks, three ofwhich along with three other national parks, make up region 8 (Khon Kaen), and Phu Kao–Phu Phan Kham in region 10 (Udon Thani) of Thailand's protected areas.
 Phu Pha Man National Park, 
 Phu Wiang National Park, 
 Phu Kao–Phu Phan Kham National Park, 
 Nam Phong National Park,

Symbols

Culture

Sinxay
The mayor of Khon Kaen in 2005 chose Sinxay to be the new identity of the Khon Kaen and had finials designed representing Sinxay and his two brothers, Siho and Sangthong. The story of Sang Sinxay, one of the masterpieces of Lao literature written by Pang Kham in 1649, during the Lan Xang period.

Administrative divisions

Provincial government

The province is divided into 26 districts (amphoes). The districts are further divided into 198 subdistricts (tambons) and 2,139 villages (mubans).

 The numbers 26 to 28 were reserved for three other planned (minor) districts: Phu Kham Noi, Nong Kae, and Non Han.
There are plans to split off the northwestern part of the province to form a new province centered at Phu Wiang. The other districts which will belong to this new province are Nong Ruea, Chum Phae, Si Chomphu, Phu Pha Man, Nong Na Kham, and Wiang Kao.

Local government
As of 26 November 2019 there are: one Khon Kaen Provincial Administration Organisation and 84 municipal (thesaban) areas in the province. Khon Kaen has city (thesaban nakhon) status. Ban Phai, Ban Thum, Chum Pae, Kranuan, Mueang Phon and Sila have town (thesaban mueang) status. Further 77 subdistrict municipalities (thesaban tambon). The non-municipal areas are administered by 140 Subdistrict Administrative Organisations - SAO (ongkan borihan suan tambon).

Education

Universities
Khon Kaen University

Schools
 Khon Kaen Wittayayon School

Health 
Khon Kaen has hospitals operated by both the public and private sectors. Its main hospital operated by the Ministry of Public Health is Khon Kaen Hospital. The province also has a university hospital, Srinagarind Hospital of the Faculty of Medicine, Khon Kaen University.

Transport 

Air
Khon Kaen Airport. 

Rail
The railway system in Khon Kaen is on both northeastern routes from Bangkok Railway Station. Khon Kaen province's main railway stations was Khon Kaen Railway Station. In 2017, a 60 kilometre dual-track line will connect Khon Kaen to Nakhon Ratchasima province. It is the first segment of a dual track network that will connect Isan with the Laem Chabang seaport.

Road
The city is bisected by Mittraphap Road, also known as "Friendship Highway", or Asian Highway 2 (AH2), the road linking Bangkok to the Thai-Lao Friendship Bridge. A multi-lane by-pass enables through-traffic to avoid the city centre to the west, and connects to the airport and to the main roads to Kalasin province and Maha Sarakham province in the east, and Udon Thani province in the north.

Sport 
The sports teams listed below are based in Khon Kaen.
Football
Khon Kaen (Thai League 2)—Khon Kaen Provincial Stadium
Khon Kaen United (Thai League 2)—Khon Kaen Provincial Stadium
Volleyball
Khonkaen Star (Women's Volleyball Thailand League)—Khonkaen International Convention and Exhibition Center

Human achievement index 2017

Since 2003, United Nations Development Programme (UNDP) in Thailand has tracked progress on human development at sub-national level using the Human achievement index (HAI), a composite index covering all the eight key areas of human development. National Economic and Social Development Board (NESDB) has taken over this task since 2017.

Sister cities
 Nanning, Guangxi, China  (2001)
 Gaborone, Botswana

Notable residents
Paradorn Srichaphan, tennis player, the first Asian to reach top ten of the ATP rankings
Somluck Kamsing, boxer, the first Thai athlete to win a gold medal at the Olympics
Nadech Kugimiya, actor
Sukollawat Kanarot, actor
Peechaya Wattanamontree, actress
Apichatpong Weerasethakul, filmmaker
Kanphanitnan Muangkhumsakul, professional golfer (LPGA Tour)

Gallery

References

External links

Province page from the Tourist Authority of Thailand

Official website of province  (Thai only)

 
Isan
Provinces of Thailand